A manger is a trough or box of carved stone or wood construction used to hold food for animals.

Manger may also refer to:

People
Albert Manger (1899-1985), American weightlifter
Carola von der Weth (born Manger, 1959), German chess master
Itzik Manger (1901-1969), Yiddish writer
James Manger (born 1958), former English cricketer
Josef Manger (1913-1991), German weightlifter
Jürgen von Manger (1923-1994), German actor and comedian
Rosi Manger, Swiss curler
William Manger (disambiguation), a list of several people named William Manger

Places
Manger, Norway, a village in Alver municipality in Vestland county, Norway
Manger (municipality), a former municipality in Vestland county, Norway
Manger Church, a church in Alver municipality in Vestland county, Norway
Manger Square, a square in Bethlehem, Palestinian territories
Mount Manger, a mountain in Antarctica
The Manger, a dry valley below Whitehorse Hill in Oxfordshire, England

Businesses
Manger Hotels, a former hotel chain

Other
Away in a Manger, a Christmas carol